The Five is a 2013 South Korean thriller horror film written and directed by Jeong Yeon-shik based on his own webtoon The 5ive Hearts, which first appeared on internet portal Daum in April 2011.

Kim Sun-a starred as a disabled woman who gathers four desperate people in need of organs to take revenge on the serial killer who murdered her family.

Plot
Eun-ah was living a perfect, happy life with her family until a sociopathic young man named Jae-wook brutally and senselessly murders her husband and daughter in front of her eyes. Barely escaping alive herself, Eun-ah is left half-paralyzed and reliant on a wheelchair. After her recovery, she grows fixated on taking revenge on him. Two years later, following a long search, she hones in within striking distance of the killer. Faced with such a dangerous adversary and her immobility, Eun-ah gathers four people marginalized by society, each with a different skill, to help her kill Jae-wook. In exchange, she is prepared to give them something they desperately need—her organs. All four accomplices—which include a North Korean defector, an ex-gangster, a doctor, and an engineer—are in need of organ transplants for various reasons, and Eun-ah promises them her organs once her revenge is complete. But things don't go as planned, and the killer turns the tables and starts hunting them himself.

Cast

Kim Sun-a as Go Eun-ah
On Joo-wan as Oh Jae-wook
Ma Dong-seok as Jang Dae-ho, ex-gangster
Shin Jung-geun as Nam-cheol, engineer
Jung In-gi as Cheol-min, doctor
Lee Chung-ah as Park Jeong-ha, computer technician
Park Hyo-joo as Hye-jin, Christian social worker
Lee Yong-yi as Jeong-ha's mother
Jo Han-cheol as Kim Seong-il, Eun-ah's husband
Kim Hyun-soo as Kim Ga-young, Eun-ah's daughter
Choi Hak-rak as Jeong-do 
Jung Soo-young as Dae-ho's wife
Yeo Min-joo as Hyeon-joo, hospital patient
Lee Jun-hyeok as Detective Park 
Park Ji-hong as Park Kyeong-soo, parking attendant
Han Yeon-kyeong as Chae-young, Ga-young's school friend 
Lee Seung-hoon as Min-soo
Go Bong-gu as Sang-gu
Oh Min-ae as Baker
Oh Man-seok as Loan shark boss 
Kim Gyeong-ran as Minimart owner
Kim Min-kyu

References

External links
 
 

The 5ive Hearts webtoon at Daum 

2013 films
South Korean thriller films
Films based on South Korean webtoons
South Korean films about revenge
Live-action films based on comics
CJ Entertainment films
2010s South Korean films